Amalraj Anthony Arputharaj (born 24 January 1986) is a professional table tennis player from Tamil Nadu India. He won silver medal at 2014 Commonwealth Games in doubles with Sharath Kamal.

Amalraj won the National Table Tennis Championship in January 2012, beating the Indian legend, Sharath Kamal in the finals.

Arjuna Awardee in 2017.

In 2018 Commonwealth Games held at Gold Coast, Australia, he won gold medal in men's team event with Sharath Kamal, Harmeet Desai, Sathiyan Gnanasekaran & Sanil Shetty.

He won gold medal in South Asian games 2019 in Men's Singles Table tennis tournament

References

Living people
1986 births
Indian male table tennis players
Tamil sportspeople
Commonwealth Games silver medallists for India
Commonwealth Games medallists in table tennis
Table tennis players at the 2018 Commonwealth Games
Table tennis players at the 2014 Commonwealth Games
Table tennis players at the 2010 Asian Games
Table tennis players at the 2014 Asian Games
Table tennis players at the 2018 Asian Games
Asian Games medalists in table tennis
Asian Games bronze medalists for India
Medalists at the 2018 Asian Games
Recipients of the Arjuna Award
Medallists at the 2018 Commonwealth Games
South Asian Games gold medalists for India
South Asian Games silver medalists for India
South Asian Games medalists in table tennis